Ernest Fourneau (4 October 1872 – 5 August 1949) was a French pharmacist graduated in Pharmacy 1898 for the Paris university specialist in medicinal chemical and pharmacology who played a major role in the discovery of synthetic local anesthetics, as well as in the synthesis of suramin. He authored more than two hundred scholarly works, and has been described as having "helped to establish the fundamental laws of chemotherapy that have saved so many human lives".

Fourneau was a pupil of Friedel and Moureu, and studied in the German laboratories of Ludwig Gattermann in Heidelberg, Hermann Emil Fischer in Berlin and Richard Willstätter in Munich. 
He headed the research laboratory of Poulenc Frères in Ivry-sur-Seine from 1903 to 1911.
One of the products was a synthetic local anesthetic that was named Stovaine (amylocaine). 
This was a pun on the English translation of "fourneau" as "stove". (The same pun was used in the brand name of the drug acetarsol, Stovarsol.)
Other important medicines were antipyretics.
In 1910 Fourneau accepted the directorship of the Pasteur Institute's medical chemistry section, with the condition that he maintained his ties with Poulenc Frères. He recruited Germaine Benoit to work in the Institute as a new graduate.

He was a member of the Académie Nationale de Médecine.

Bibliography

References

Sources

French biochemists
French pharmacologists
Knights of the Order of Agricultural Merit
Officers of the Order of Polonia Restituta
Complutense University of Madrid
Officiers of the Légion d'honneur
People from Biarritz
1872 births
1949 deaths